Allucquére Rosanne "Sandy" Stone (born c. 1936) is an American academic theorist, media theorist, author, and performance artist. She is currently Associate Professor and Founding Director of the Advanced Communication Technologies Laboratory (ACTLab) and the New Media Initiative in the department of Radio-TV-Film at the University of Texas at Austin.  Concurrently she is Wolfgang Kohler Professor of Media and Performance at the European Graduate School EGS, senior artist at the Banff Centre, and Humanities Research Institute Fellow at the University of California, Irvine.  Stone has worked in and written about film, music, experimental neurology, writing, engineering, and computer programming. Stone is transgender and is considered a founder of the academic discipline of transgender studies.  She has been profiled in Artforum, Wired, Mondo 2000, and other publications, and been interviewed for documentaries like Traceroute.

Early life and career

Stone was born in Jersey City, New Jersey in 1936. Stone is Jewish and has stated her birth name was "Zelig Ben-Nausaan Cohen in Hebrew."

Stone has stated that she disliked formal education and preferred auditing classes with university professors whose work she admired. She has stated she worked at Bell Telephone Laboratories, then worked odd jobs to support her own research. She later graduated from St. John's College in Annapolis, Maryland, receiving a B.A. in 1965.

Recording engineer, science fiction, and computing

In the late 1960s Stone moved to New York City and embarked on a career as a recording engineer, initially on the East Coast, and later on the West Coast. In 1969, Stone wrote about an April 7 recording session at Record Plant Studios with Jimi Hendrix for Zygote magazine. According to journalist David S. Bennahum, Stone "used to wear a long black cape and full beard."

In the early 1970s, Stone published several science fiction pieces under the pen name Sandy Fisher in The Magazine of Fantasy and Science Fiction and Galaxy magazine.

In 1974 Stone withdrew from mainstream recording, settled in Santa Cruz, California, and underwent gender reassignment with Donald Laub at  the Stanford Gender Dysphoria Program in Palo Alto. The name "Allucquére" comes from a character in her friend Robert A. Heinlein's novel, The Puppet Masters (1951).

Later she became a member of the Olivia Records collective, a popular women's music label, and began collaboration within lesbian feminist circles. She was Olivia's sound engineer from ca. 1974-1978, recording and mixing all Olivia product during this period.

In the early 1980s, Stone built a small computer, taught herself programming, and became a freelance coder, eventually becoming recognized as a computer expert.

Academic career

Attacks by Janice Raymond in The Transsexual Empire

In 1979, the lesbian feminist scholar Janice Raymond mounted an ad hominem attack on Stone in The Transsexual Empire: The Making of the She-Male.  Raymond accused Stone by name of plotting to destroy the Olivia Records collective and womanhood in general with "male energy." In 1976, prior to publication, Raymond had sent a draft of the chapter attacking Stone to the Olivia collective "for comment", apparently in anticipation of outing Stone.  Raymond appeared unaware that Stone had informed the collective of her transgender status before agreeing to join.  The collective did return comments to Raymond, suggesting that her description of transgender and of Stone's place in and effect on the collective was at odds with the reality of the collective's interaction with Stone.  Raymond responded by increasing the virulence of her transphobic attack on Stone in the published version of the manuscript:

Masculine behavior is notably obtrusive.  It is significant that transsexually constructed lesbian feminists have inserted themselves into positions of importance and/or performance in the feminist community. Sandy Stone, the transsexual engineer with Olivia Records, an "all-women" recording company, illustrates this well. Stone is not only crucial to the Olivia enterprise but plays a very dominant role there.  The ... visibility he [sic] achieved in the aftermath of the Olivia controversy ... only serves to enhance his [sic] previously dominant role and to divide women, as men frequently do, when they make their presence necessary and vital to women. As one woman wrote: "I feel raped when Olivia passes off Sandy ... as a real woman. After all his [sic] male privilege, is he [sic] going to cash in on lesbian feminist culture too?"

The collective responded in turn by publicly defending Stone in various feminist publications of the time. Stone continued as a member of the collective and continued to record Olivia artists until political dissension over her transgender status, exacerbated by Raymond's book, culminated in 1979 in the threat of a boycott of Olivia products. After long debate, Stone left the collective and returned to Santa Cruz.

The Empire Strikes Back: A Posttranssexual Manifesto

In 1983 Stone befriended cultural theorist Donna Haraway, a faculty member in the History of Consciousness program at the University of California, Santa Cruz. Haraway was in the process of writing the watershed essay "A Cyborg Manifesto". While Stone was studying for her doctorate with Haraway and James Clifford, she produced the 1987 essay "The Empire Strikes Back: A Posttranssexual Manifesto". The work was influenced by early versions of Haraway's "A Cyborg Manifesto" and first published in Social Text, and by the turbulent political foment in cultural feminism of that period. Susan Stryker and Stephen Whittle situate Stone's work in the turbulent events of the time as a response to Raymond's attack:

Stone exacts her revenge more than a decade later, not by waging an anti-feminist counterattack on Raymond, but by undermining the foundationalist assumptions that support Raymond's narrower concept of womanhood, and by claiming a speaking position for transsexuals that cannot be automatically dismissed as damaged, deluded, second-rate, or somehow inherently compromised.

An important point of the essay was that transgender persons were ill-served by hiding their status, and that coming out—which Stone called "reading oneself aloud"—would inevitably lead to self-empowerment.  Thus "The Empire Strikes Back" rearticulated what was at the time a radical gay-lesbian political statement into a transgender voice. During this period, mainstream gay and lesbian activists generally suppressed transgender issues and visible transgender activists, fearing that they would frighten the uncertain and still shaky liberal base during a delicate period of consolidation. "The Empire Strikes Back" galvanized young transgender scholars and focused their attention on the need for self-assertion within a largely reactionary institutional structure. "The Empire Strikes Back" later became the center of an extensive citation network of transgender academics and a foundational work for transgender researchers and theorists. Stryker and Whittle, writing in The Transgender Studies Reader, refer to "The Empire Strikes Back" as

the protean text from which contemporary transgender studies emerged ... In the wake of (the) article, a gradual but steady body of new academic and creative work by transgender people has gradually taken shape, which has enriched virtually every academic and artistic discipline with new critical perspectives on gender.

As of 2007, "The Empire Strikes Back" had been translated into twenty-seven languages and had been cited in hundreds of publications.

In 2011, Indiana University Bloomington hosted a conference honoring the twentieth anniversary of the publication of "The Empire Strikes Back".  Stone was guest of honor, and while onstage commented "Last year I was invited to a conference about my work on four days' notice.  I asked why they waited until the last minute, and they said they would have invited me sooner, but because I was considered a founder of the field they assumed I was dead. I'm not."

Return to academia

From 1987 to 1993 Stone was Haraway's student, marking Stone's return to academia. At Haraway's suggestion Stone visited University of California, San Diego campus as an exchange student in the newly formed Science Studies program. Following a dispute between progressive and conservative faculty factions, Stone was offered a job as Instructor in the Department of Sociology, teaching courses in sociology, anthropology, political science, English, communications, and the experimental program "The Making of the Modern World.", In 1992, she took an appointment as an assistant professor at the University of Texas, Austin.

Stone received her doctorate in 1993. Her dissertation, "Presence", which Haraway supervised, was published in 1996 by MIT Press as The War of Desire and Technology at the Close of the Mechanical Age. Stone described the work as "creat(ing) a discourse which contains all the elements of the original discourse but which is quite different from it ... remember that at heart I am a narrator, a shameless teller of stories." In the years following the book's publication, several major social science departments fractured into separate departments along lines that in part came to be drawn by reference to "Desire and Technology" and other, similar publications.

UT Austin ACTLab

Beginning in 1993, Stone established the New Media program she named ACTLab (Advanced Communication Technologies Laboratory) in the Radio-Television-Film department.  This work, and research in virtual communities, social software, and novel methods of presenting academic topics, drew wide attention, and contributed to the establishment and legitimation of what is now generally called New Media Art.

Stone's work and presence in the RTF department has been bitterly contested by powerful conservative faculty members, who have repeatedly tried to remove or marginalize her. In 1998 this small but vocal group issued a negative departmental report recommending that Stone be denied tenure. The university overruled this report, citing Stone's  contributions to multiple fields and reaffirming its commitment to original or unusual scholarship.

Granting Stone tenure had the negative effect of provoking attacks on her work and credibility by powerful conservative faculty within the RTF department, which for years has responded to inquiries with the statement that there is no New Media program or program called ACTLab within the department. (Based on university course listings and rosters, as of 2007 there were approximately 70 ACTLab students in active courses, 400 former students, and 2500 student webpages on the ACTLab website. The program attracts students from a broad range of departments and from other institutions.) In a 2006 talk at Arizona State University, Stone compared the RTF department's attempts to erase her work and presence to previous efforts by conservative administrators to deny voice to any unfamiliar or emergent disciplines or unusual people, and said it was merely to be expected.

Stone's career has been controversial.  In the mid-1990s she gave several highly publicized interviews during which she suggested that the era of academic scholarship, as the term was generally understood, was over:

The reality of the situation is that academicians are no longer the sole privileged custodians of objects of knowledge called books ... in an era in our developed nations when the ubiquity of almost instantaneous communication puts us in a situation where almost everything is everywhen, the imperial mandate of the university as a privileged site of truth and an authorization for guild membership has evaporated; though, like the dinosaur, it may take a while for that knowledge to reach the central nervous system.4

Since that time, although Stone continued to tour extensively, to present "theoryperformances" and formal theatrical performances, and to address her work to a wide variety of audiences across broad sampling of disciplines and skills, she has published less and less in print journals. This reached the extent that a group of her students took up the practice of recording, transcribing and printing her in-class lectures for their own use.

In 1999, she appeared in Gendernauts: A Journey Through Shifting Identities, a film by Monika Treut featuring Texas Tomboy, Susan Stryker, and Hida Viloria, a group of artists in San Francisco who live between the poles of conventional gender identities.

In 2006, Stone began touring a theatrical performance titled The Neovagina Monologues, modeled on the work of Spalding Gray, although the title is a tribute to a work by Eve Ensler.

In 2010 Stone retired from her position at the University of Texas, becoming Professor Emerita and continuing her ACTLab work by launching several programs based on the ACTLab model, most notably the ACTLab@EGS program at the European Graduate School in Saas-Fee, Switzerland. The ACTLab pedagogical model brought her international recognition; subsequently the ACTLab framework for education in the arts and technology has been adopted by many other programs such as the Entertainment Technology Center at Carnegie Mellon University in Pittsburgh and the New Media Innovation Lab at Arizona State University at Tempe.  As of 2011 she was actively touring, speaking and performing, and had mounted several gallery installations of interactive art.

Personal life

During online virtual community research in 1994 Stone met Cynbe ru Taren (Jeffrey Prothero), a researcher, programmer and virtual worlds creator, who authored Citadel, an influential bulletin board system. Stone and ru Taren were married in 1995. He died of cancer in 2016. Stone and ru Taren divided their time between Santa Cruz and Austin. His extended family and her daughter, Tanith Stone Thole, also live in Santa Cruz.

References

Selected publications

 "Will The Real Body Please Stand Up?: Boundary Stories About Virtual Cultures", in Michael Benedikt, ed., Cyberspace: First Steps (Cambridge, 1991: MIT Press)
 "Sex, Death, and Architecture", in Architecture- New York (New York 1992: ANY)
 "Virtual Systems", in Jonathan Crary and Sanford Kwinter, eds., ZONE 6: Incorporations (Cambridge 1993: MIT Press)
 "The Architecture of Elsewhere", in Hraszthan Zeitlian (ed.), Semiotext(e) Architecture (New York 1993: Semiotext(e))
 "The Empire Strikes Back: A Posttranssexual Manifesto", in Kristina Straub and Julia Epstein, eds., Body Guards: The Cultural Politics of Sexual Ambiguity (New York: Routledge 1991), extensively reprinted in other publications.  (This essay is frequently cited as the origin of the academic field known as Transgender Studies.)  Available online at 
 The War of Desire and Technology at the Close of the Mechanical Age (Cambridge 1996: MIT Press)
"The Langley Circuit", in Galaxy (as Sandy Fisher) May 1972
"Farewell to the Artifacts", in Galaxy (as Sandy Fisher) July 1972
"Thank God You're Alive", in The Magazine of Fantasy and Science Fiction (as Sandy Fisher)  October 1971
"Cyberdammerung at Wellspring Systems", in Marianne Moser and Douglas MacLeod, eds., Immersed In Technology: Art and Virtual Environments (Cambridge, Mass., 1996: MIT Press)
"Sex and Death Among the Disembodied: VR, Cyberspace, and the Nature of Academic Discourse", in Susan Leigh Star, ed.: Cultures of Computing (Chicago, 1995: University of Chicago Press)
"Identity in Oshkosh", in Judith Halberstam and Ira Livingston, eds.: Posthuman Bodies (Bloomington, Indiana, 1995: Indiana University Press)
"Violation and Virtuality: Two Cases of Physical and Psychological Boundary Transgression and Their Implications", in Judith Halberstam and Ira Livingston, eds.: Posthuman Bodies (Bloomington, Indiana, 1995: Indiana University Press)
"Split Subjects, Not Atoms, or How I Fell In Love With My Prosthesis", in Roddey Reid, ed.: Configurations, special issue: Located Knowledges (Baltimore, Maryland, 1994: Johns Hopkins University Press)

Further reading

External links

Allucquére Rosanne Stone / Sandy Stone personal website
Sandy Stone - Professor of New Media and Performance Studies - Biography via European Graduate School
Sandy Stone profile via Advanced Communication Technologies Laboratory (ACTLab) at the University of Texas at Austin.

1936 births
Living people
Artists from New York City
Transfeminists
Transgender women
Transgender writers
Transgender artists
Academic staff of European Graduate School
Gender studies academics
Jewish American academics
Jewish artists
Jewish philosophers
American women writers
Writers from Jersey City, New Jersey
LGBT Jews
LGBT people from Texas
LGBT people from New Jersey
Transgender Jews
Jewish American artists
Violence against trans women
American victims of anti-LGBT hate crimes
Women's music
Artists from Jersey City, New Jersey
University of Texas at Austin faculty
American audio engineers
Transgender academics
Transgender studies academics